Campiglossa punctella is a species of tephritid or fruit flies in the genus Campiglossa of the family Tephritidae.

Distribution
Scandinavia, Germany, Switzerland, Ukraine.

References

Tephritinae
Insects described in 1814
Diptera of Europe